M. L. Varghese (1960 – 3 February 2011), popularly known by stage name Machan Varghese, was a Malayalam film actor and mimicry artist. He started his career as a mimicry artist in Kalabhavan (house of arts)  and debuted as an actor through Kabooliwala. Thereafter he played many notable roles in Malayalam films, mainly as a comedian. His association with Siddique-Lal, Rafi-Mecartin and Lal Jose are particularly noted. Within a career of nearly two decades, he acted in over 100 films. Varghese died on 3 February 2011 in Kozhikode of cancer. He was aged 50.

Education & Family 
M. L. Varghese (Machan) completed his high school education in 1970's from St. Albert's High School, Ernakulam. He was married to Elsy. The couple have a son Robin Varghese and a daughter Rincy.

Filmography

 2012: Orange(posthumously)
 2011: Maharaja Talkies
 2010: Nizhal
 2010 : Best Of Luck
 2010: Kadaksham
 2010: Paappi Appacha
 2010: Njan Sanchari
 2010:  Cheriya Kallanum Valiya Policum  
 2010: Thaskara Lahala
 2010: Canvas (2010 film)
 2010: Bombay Mittayi
 2010: Best of Luck
 2009: Paribhavam
 2009: Duplicate as Susheelan
 2009: Sanmanasullavan Appukuttan 
 2009: Kancheepurathe Kalyanam as Postman Velayudhan
 2009:  Hailesa 
 2009: Changathikoottam as Markose
 2008: Jubilee as Shake
 2008: Crazy Gopalan
 2008: Kovalam
 2008: Mayakazhcha  as Vikraman 
 2007: Black Cat
 2007: Anamika
 2007: Inspector Garud  as Kunjunni
 2007: Changathipoocha as Palisa Thomas
 2007: Black Cat
 2006: Pachakuthira
 2006: Aanachantham
 2005: Kalyanakurimanam
 2005: Thommanum Makkalum
 2005: Isra
 2004: Greetings
 2004: Chathikkatha Chanthu
 2004: Rasikan as Velu Annan
 2004: Jalolsavam
 2004: Kusruthi
 2004: Thalamelam as D'cruz
 2004:  Shambu
 2004: Aparichithan as Watchman Bhaskaran
 2004: Vamanapuram Busroute
 2003: Pattalam as Pushkaran
 2003: Thilakkam as Kunjavara
 2003: Sadanantante Samayam
 2003: Chakram
 2003: Sahodaran Sahadevan as Kuttappan
 2003: Swantham Malavika as Keshavan
 2003: Hariharan Pilla Happyanu
 2003: Meerayude Dhukhavum Muthuvinte Swapnavum
 2003: C.I.D. Moosa as Sebastian
 2002: Meesha Madhavan as Lineman Lonappan
 2002: Malayali Mamanu Vanakkam
 2002: Mazhathullikilukkam
 2002: www.anukudumbam.com
 2002: Kaashillatheyum Jeevikkam
 2002: Akhila as Ayappan
 2002: Savithriyude Aranjanam
 2002: Chirikudukka as Thulasidharan 
 2001: Pranayakalathu
 2001: Ee Parakkum Thalika
 2001: Uthaman
 2001: Rajapattam
 2001: Chitrathoonukal
 2000: Thenkasipattanam as Karavettan
 2000: Kaathara
 2000: Ee Mazha Thenmazha
 2000: Mera Naam Joker as D'cruz
 1999: Vazhunoor as Cleetus
 1999: Jananayakan as Muniyappan
 1999: Friends
 1999: Auto Brothers
 1998: Punjabi House as Panthalukaran
 1998: Thattakam
 1998: Sooryavanam 
 1998: Achaammakkuttiyude Achaayan
1998: Chenapparampile Aanakkaaryam
 1997: Adukkala Rahasyam Angaadippaattu
 1997: Kalyana Pittennu
 1997: Anjarakalyanam
 1997: Swantham Makalkku Snehapoorvam
 1997: Ikkareyanente Manasam as Pokker
 1997: Gajaraja Manthram
 1997: Maayapponmaan
 1997: Siamese Irattakal
 1997: Moonnu Kodiyum 300 Pavanum
 1997: Newspaper Boy
 1997: Kilikurissiyile Kudumba Mela
 1996: Manthramothiram
 1996: Hitler
 1996: Padanayakan
 1996: Man of the Match
 1996: The Porter
 1995: Hijack
 1995: Puthukkottayile Puthumanavaalan
 1995: Mannar Mathai Speaking
 1994: Moonnam Loka Pattalam as Earupadakkam
 1994: Kabooliwala
 1993: Pravachakan
 1989: Swantham Ennu Karuthi

Television
Kadamattathu Kathanar (Asianet)

References

External links

Machan Varghese at MSI

1960 births
2011 deaths
Indian male film actors
Indian male comedians
Male actors from Kochi
Deaths from cancer in India
Male actors in Malayalam cinema
20th-century Indian male actors
21st-century Indian male actors